Jiří Hanke (12 December 1924, Dolní Bučice – 11 December 2006, Lausanne), also known as Jorge Hanke or Georg Hanke, was a Czech footballer and later football manager, who played internationally for Czechoslovakia, earning five caps.

In the close season of 1950 he joined FC St. Pauli where he played a few friendlies but the club failed to get him eligible for league matches. Hanke had a spell in Colombia with Samarios during the 1951 season, and later, in France where he resurfaced at RC Lens.

He coached FC Biel, Red Star, Xerxes Rotterdam and Vevey Sports.

References

Bibliography

External links
 La Liga profile
 
 
 

1924 births
2006 deaths
People from Kutná Hora District
Sportspeople from the Central Bohemian Region
Czechoslovak footballers
Czech footballers
Association football forwards
Czechoslovakia international footballers
Ligue 1 players
La Liga players
SK Slavia Prague players
Unión Magdalena footballers
RC Lens players
FC Barcelona players
CD Condal players
Czechoslovak football managers
Czech football managers
FC Biel-Bienne managers
Red Star F.C. managers
Czechoslovak expatriate footballers
Czechoslovak expatriate football managers
Czechoslovak expatriate sportspeople in France
Expatriate footballers in France
Expatriate football managers in France
Czechoslovak expatriate sportspeople in Spain
Expatriate footballers in Spain
Czechoslovak expatriate sportspeople in Switzerland
Expatriate football managers in Switzerland
Czechoslovak expatriate sportspeople in the Netherlands
Expatriate football managers in the Netherlands